Kannamma En Kadhali is a 1945 Indian Tamil-language film starring M. K. Radha and M. S. Sundari Bai. The film was directed by Kothamangalam Subbu, marking his directorial debut. No print of the film is known to survive, making it a lost film.

Plot 
A wealthy, lecherous old man named Vaiyapuri finds a young girl lost in a temple festival crowd and brings her up with the intention of marrying her later. Without his knowledge, the young woman, Sundari falls in love with a young man Muthu and the two play smart games fooling the old man.

Cast 
Cast in order of the film's song book

 M. K. Radha as Muthu
 M. S. Sundari Bai as Sundari
 L. Narayana Rao as Vaiyapuri
 P. A. Subbaiah Pillai as Doctor
 S. Krishnamoorthy as Pottai
 Kulathu Mani as Natesa Mudaliar
 Appanna Iyengar as Kuppan
 Angamuthu as Pechi

 Velayutham as Velayutham
 Ramamurthi as Thief
 Viswanathan as Doctor Sundaresan
 Joker Ramadu as Astrologer
 Seetharaman as Priest
 Sundara Rao as Friend
 Chitralekha, Dhanam as Female Dancers
 Niranjala Devi as Young Dancer

Production 
This film is based on the French play The School for Wives by the 17th century playwright Molière.

Soundtrack 
Music was composed by M. D. Parthasarathy and lyrics were penned by Kothamangalam Subbu.

References 

1945 films
1940s Tamil-language films
Indian black-and-white films
Films based on works by Molière
Indian films based on plays
Gemini Studios films
Films directed by Kothamangalam Subbu
Lost Indian films
Indian war films
War romance films
1940s war films
1945 directorial debut films
1940s lost films
Films scored by M. D. Parthasarathy